O Foxo is a place in the parish of Silleda, in Pontevedra. In 2007 it had a population of 54 people, 26 of whom were men and 28 were women. This represents a decrease in the number of people since the year 2000. It is the former capital of the county.

References

External links 

 Silleda municipal web site
 Silleda tourist web site

Municipalities in the Province of Pontevedra